Cecilia Wollmann (born 23 January 1998) is a Bermudian competitive sailor. She competed at the 2016 Summer Olympics in Rio de Janeiro, in the women's Laser Radial.

During the 2019 Pan American Games opening ceremony Wollmann carried the flag of the country as part of the parade of nations.

References

1998 births
Living people
Bermudian female sailors (sport)
Olympic sailors of Bermuda
Sailors at the 2016 Summer Olympics – Laser Radial
Sailors at the 2014 Summer Youth Olympics
Sailors at the 2015 Pan American Games
Sailors at the 2019 Pan American Games
Pan American Games competitors for Bermuda